Stanley Jeyaraja Tambiah (16 January 1929 – 19 January 2014) was a social anthropologist and Esther and Sidney Rabb Professor (Emeritus) of Anthropology at Harvard University. He specialised in studies of Thailand, Sri Lanka, and Tamils, as well as the anthropology of religion and politics.

Biography 
Tambiah was born in Sri Lanka to a Christian Tamil family. He attended S. Thomas' College, Mount Lavinia for his primary and secondary education. After finishing his undergraduate education at the University of Ceylon in 1951, he attended Cornell University, graduating in 1954 with a PhD.
He began teaching sociology at the University of Ceylon in 1955, where he remained until 1960. After a few years as the UNESCO Teaching Assistant for Thailand, he taught at the University of Cambridge from 1963 to 1972 and at the University of Chicago from 1973 to 1976.
He joined the faculty of Harvard University in 1976.

His earliest major published work was an ethno-historical study of modern and medieval Thailand. He then became interested in the comparative study of the ways Western categories of magic, science and religion have been used by anthropologists to make sense of other cultures which do not use this three-part system. After the outbreak of civil war in Sri Lanka, he began to study the role of competing religious and ethnic identities in that country. At Harvard, he trained several generations of anthropologists in a number of fields. He also served on the National Research Council's Committee for International Conflict Resolution. He did field research on the Organisation of Buddhist temples in Sri Lanka (Monks, Priests and Peasants, a Study of Buddhism and Social Structure in Central Ceylon and several papers in the American Anthropologists and the Journal of Asian Studies).

Awards 
In November 1997, Tambiah received the prestigious Balzan Prize for "penetrating social-anthropological analysis of the fundamental problems of ethnic violence in South East Asia and original studies on the dynamics of Buddhist societies [that] have opened the way to an innovative and rigorous social-anthropological approach to the internal dynamics of different civilizations".
A month later, the Royal Anthropological Institute of Great Britain and Ireland awarded him its highest recognition,
the Huxley Memorial Medal and Lecture.
In September 1998, he was awarded the Fukuoka Asian Culture Prize by the city of Fukuoka, capital of Fukuoka Prefecture, Japan.

In 2000, he became a Corresponding Fellow of the British Academy,
a title given to those who have "attained high international standing" in a discipline in the humanities or social sciences.

Selected publications 
Buddhism and the Spirit Cults in North-East Thailand. Cambridge University Press, 1970. .
World Conqueror and World Renouncer : A Study of Buddhism and Polity in Thailand against a Historical Background (Cambridge Studies in Social and Cultural Anthropology). Cambridge University Press, 1976. .
The Buddhist Saints of the Forest and the Cult of Amulets. Cambridge University Press, 1984.
Form and Meaning of Magical Acts, in "Culture, Thought, and Social Action: An Anthropological Perspective", Harvard University Press, 1985 [1973], pp. 60–86.
Sri Lanka: Ethnic Fratricide and the Dismantling of Democracy, Chicago : University of Chicago Press, 1986. 
Magic, Science and Religion and the Scope of Rationality (Lewis Henry Morgan Lectures). Cambridge University Press, 1990. .
Buddhism Betrayed? : Religion, Politics, and Violence in Sri Lanka (A Monograph of the World I''nstitute for Development Economics Research). University of Chicago Press, 1992. .
Leveling Crowds : Ethnonationalist Conflicts and Collective Violence in South Asia. (Comparative Studies in Religion and Society). University of California Press, 1996. .
Edmund Leach: An Anthropological Life. Cambridge University Press, 2002. .

See also 
List of Balzan Prize recipients

References

External links 

 Emiko Ohnuki-Tierney, "Stanley J. Tambiah", Biographical Memoirs of the National Academy of Sciences (2015)

1929 births
2014 deaths
American anthropologists
Social anthropologists
Cornell University alumni
Anthropologists of religion
Harvard University faculty
Sri Lankan emigrants to the United States
American people of Sri Lankan Tamil descent
Sri Lankan Christians
Sri Lankan Tamil academics
Sri Lankan Indologists
Members of the United States National Academy of Sciences
Corresponding Fellows of the British Academy